Verena Loewensberg (May 28, 1912 – April 27, 1986) was a Swiss painter and graphic designer.

Life
Verena Loewensberg was the oldest daughter of a family of doctors in Zurich. After two years at the Kunstgewerbeschule (now: Schule für Gestaltung) in Basel (1927-1929), she became a textile weaver in Speicher, Switzerland. In 1931 she married the designer Hans Coray. The couple had two children: Stephan in 1943 and Henriette in 1946. She subsequently separated from her husband.

Loewensberg had a lifelong friendship with the painter Max Bill and his wife Binia.

In 1936 she painted the first concrete pictures and helped in 1937 with the founding of an association of modern artists in Zurich. In the center were the Zürcher Konkreten. Loewensberg associated with Max Bill, Camille Graeser and Richard Paul Lohse. She participated in their successful group exhibitions. In addition, she was inspired by the work of Georges Vantongerloo and Piet Mondrian. In the 1950s and 1960s she worked for Guhl and Geigy. She also taught.

Exhibitions
1977: Gallery Karin Fesel, Wiesbaden
1992: Retrospective. Aargau Art Gallery, Aarau
March 7 to April 25, 1999: Museum of Art-Free Art, Otterndorf (Germany)
November 23, 2006 - March 31, 2007: Infinite consequences. House Konstruktiv, Zurich
April 22 to June 12, 2009: Verena Loewensberg - Printing Graphics. Graphic collection of the ETH, Zurich
May 12 to August 5, 2012: Retrospective. Art Museum Winterthur

References

Kathrin Siebert, Paul Tanner and Henriette Coray (Ed.): Verena Loewensberg 1912-1986. List of printing graphics. With a contribution by Bernadette Walter. Catalog. In 2009.
Elisabeth Grossmann: Verena Loewensberg. Works monograph and catalog of paintings. Scheidegger & Spiess, Zurich 2012,  .
Breuer, Gerda, Meer, Julia (eds.): Women in Graphic Design, Jovis, Berlin 2012, p. 505,  .

Content in is translated from the existing German Wikipedia article at :de:Verena Loewensberg

1912 births
1986 deaths
20th-century Swiss painters
Swiss women painters
20th-century Swiss women artists